Yuri Yatsev (born March 2, 1979) is a Russian water polo player who played on the silver medal squad at the 2000 Summer Olympics.

See also
 List of Olympic medalists in water polo (men)
 List of World Aquatics Championships medalists in water polo

External links
 

1979 births
Living people
Russian male water polo players
Water polo players at the 2000 Summer Olympics
Olympic water polo players of Russia
Olympic silver medalists for Russia
Olympic medalists in water polo
Sportspeople from Moscow
Medalists at the 2000 Summer Olympics